Lyte Records is an independent record label founded and owned by Northern Irish musician and producer David Lyttle.

Artists
 Tom Harrison
 David Lyttle
 Nigel Mooney
 Jason Rebello
 Jean Toussaint
 Andreas Varady

References

External links
 

Record labels established in 2007
Jazz record labels
Alternative rock record labels
British independent record labels
Record labels from Northern Ireland